Saint-Brès is the name or part of the name of several communes in France:

 Saint-Brès, in the Gard department
 Saint-Brès, in the Gers department
 Saint-Brès, in the Hérault department